The pound was the currency of Ghana between 1958 and 1965. It was subdivided into 20 shillings, each of 12 pence. Until 1958, Ghana used the British West African pound, after which it issued its own currency. In 1965, Ghana introduced the first cedi at a rate of £1 = ₵2.40, i.e., ₵1 = 100d.

Coins

In 1958, Bronze coins were issued for d and 1d, along with cupro-nickel 3d and 6d, 1/– and 2/–. The 3d coin was scalloped in shape.

Banknotes

In 1958, banknotes were introduced in denominations of 10/–, £1 and £5. The £1 and £5 notes were produced until 1962 and the 10/– note was produced until 1963.

See also

 Economy of Ghana

References

External links

Currencies of the Commonwealth of Nations
Currencies of Ghana
History of Ghana
Modern obsolete currencies
1958 establishments in Ghana
1965 disestablishments in Ghana
Pound (currency)